Sergei Alexandrovich Ordzhonikidze (born 14 March 1946 in Moscow) is a Russian diplomat. He was the Director-General of the United Nations Office at Geneva from 2002 to 2011.

Early life and education 

He was born in Moscow in early 1946. His mother, Eteri (1923-2010), was the adopted daughter of Georgian-Soviet revolutionary Sergo Ordzhonikidze. His father was Alexander Sergeevich Piradov, a Soviet ambassador from Tbilisi. Ordzhonikidze finished his study in the Moscow State Institute of International Relations in 1969 and completed his postgraduate studies in International Law at the Diplomatic Academy of Moscow in 1978. He is fluent in English and Spanish, and knows how to speak French.

Early career 

He started his career in the Soviet diplomatic service in 1969 and served in the Permanent Mission of the Soviet Union to the United Nations in New York City until 1975. From 1975 to 1978, he was Assistant to the Deputy Foreign Minister in Moscow. From 1978 to 1983, he continued to serve in his country's permanent mission to the UN in New York City. Between 1991 and 1996, he was Deputy Permanent Representative of the Soviet Union and then of the Russian Federation to the United Nations in New York. Before that, he was Deputy Chief of the International Legal Department of the Ministry of Foreign Affairs From 1983 to 1991. From 1996 to 1999, he served as Director of the Department of International Organizations of the Ministry of Foreign Affairs. Ordzhonikidze served as Deputy Minister of Foreign Affairs of the Russian Federation, a post he had held from 1999 to 2002.

UN Geneva Director General 
He was first appointed to the position by UN Secretary-General Kofi Annan on 1 March 2002, and was re-appointed by Secretary-General Ban Ki-moon in February 2007. In 2011, he retired, being replaced by Kazakh diplomat Kassym-Jomart Tokayev.

Awards and recognition

He holds the diplomatic rank of Ambassador Extraordinary and Plenipotentiary, and has received three state awards.

 Order of Alexander Nevsky (August 17, 2017)
 Order of Honor (March 6, 2011)
 Order of Friendship (May 12, 1998)

References

External links
The Biography of Sergei Ordzhonikidze

Living people
1946 births
Diplomats from Moscow
Ambassador Extraordinary and Plenipotentiary (Russian Federation)
Diplomatic Academy of the Ministry of Foreign Affairs of the Russian Federation alumni
Moscow State Institute of International Relations alumni
Russian people of Georgian descent
Soviet diplomats
Under-Secretaries-General of the United Nations
Russian officials of the United Nations